The Specialist is a 1994 American action thriller film directed by Luis Llosa and starring Sylvester Stallone, Sharon Stone, James Woods, Eric Roberts, and Rod Steiger. It is loosely based on "The Specialist" series of novels by John Shirley. The film met with negative critical response, but became a box office success, and Gloria Estefan's version of "Turn the Beat Around" became a dance sensation.

Plot
In 1984, Captain Ray Quick and Colonel Ned Trent, explosives experts working for the CIA, are on a mission to blow up a car transporting a South American drug dealer. But when the car appears, a little girl is inside with the dealer. Ray insists they abort the mission, but Ned intends to see it through and allows the explosion to happen, resulting in the deaths of both the drug dealer and the child. Furious by the girl's wrongful death, Ray savagely beats Ned and flees, effectively resigning from the CIA right after getting Ned fired by reporting him to his superiors.

Years later, in Miami, Ray works as a freelance hit man.  He lives a solitary existence with his cat, named "Timer". Desperate people contact him via an Internet bulletin board and he takes the cases that interest him. Ray specializes in "shaping" his explosions, building and planting bombs that blow up only the intended target while leaving innocent bystanders unharmed.

He answers ads placed by a woman named May Munro and speaks to her often to decide if he should take the job or not. During the talks, he becomes intrigued by her story, coupled with the fact that he sees how attractive she is while following her. She is the only child of parents who were killed by Tomas Leon and his men. Against his better judgment, and pushed by her insistence that she will infiltrate the gang with or without him, Ray is persuaded to accept the job. Even though he has agreed, May ingratiates herself into Tomas' world as Adrian Hastings.

Ned now works for Joe Leon, Tomas' father and director of their organized crime syndicate. Once the hits on their lower level men begin, they contact the chief of police to place Ned in their bomb squad. May tolerates Tomas and plays along as his girlfriend so she can watch the hits one by one. It is revealed after the second target is killed that May has actually been forced into a partnership with Ned, whose goal was to coax Ray out of hiding. After the job in South America went wrong, Ned was dismissed from the CIA and is intent on revenge.

When the trap for Tomas is set, May is in the room; the resulting explosion appears to kill them both. When Ned goes to Joe to pay his respects, he is left alive only so he can find Ray and bring him to Joe before Tomas is buried. Both Ray and Ned believe that May is dead, yet Ray discovers that bulletin board messages are still being posted. He responds to one, quickly realizing that it is a trap set by Ned and the bomb squad, and baits Ned into an explosive tirade.

When he goes to the funeral of Adrian Hastings, Ray finds that May is alive. She went to the funeral to see if Ray would attend. Then they go to the Fontainebleau Hotel. They undress and make love in bed and in the shower. After this, she leaves. Meanwhile, Ned has gone to the cathedral and learns that the person in the casket is not May. She runs into Ned in the hotel lobby and makes an excuse as to why she did not tell him that she was alive. A henchman is ordered to take her to the car, and on the way, she asks to use the restroom. Once there, she uses a cell phone to warn Ray. He rigs the hotel room to explode, and when Ned's henchmen enter the room, it detonates, breaking the entire room off into the ocean.

May is taken to Joe Leon but Ned insists on keeping her alive to lure Ray out. Ned listens in as Ray calls May, he refuses to meet with her and be "set up" again, but she convinces him that she truly does care about him. He arranges a meeting at a seafood restaurant and May uses secret coding to tell him it's a trap before hanging up. When Ned sends May inside, the restaurant explodes. Ray and May escape on a speed boat to his warehouse. Ned listens to the recording of Ray's call and tracks down his location. The next morning, May is preparing to leave to kill Joe Leon herself, but Ray tells her to let go of the past. Ned arrives with an army of police that surround the booby-trapped warehouse. In a final showdown, Ray and May are cornered. Ned pursues them, but is done in by his own hubris when he steps on a bomb. The entire warehouse goes up due to the chain of bombs exploding, killing Trent; Ray and May escape unseen through a tunnel.

The next day, Joe reads about the incident at the warehouse. He thanks God for bringing his revenge on Ray and May. He then opens the mail brought to him and finds a necklace. It contains a picture of May's parents, seeing that it's rigged with a bomb, he curses God just before the necklace explodes. After hearing the blast and knowing all responsible for her parents' death are dead, Ray asks how she feels, to which she responds, "Better". They drive off to start their life together.

Cast

 Sylvester Stallone as Captain Ray Quick
 Sharon Stone as May Munro / Adrian Hastings
 Brittany Paige Bouck as Young May Munro
 James Woods as Colonel Ned Trent
 Eric Roberts as Tomas Leon
 Rod Steiger as Joe Leon
 Mario Ernesto Sánchez as Charlie
 Sergio Doré Jr. as Bill, The Strong Arm
 Chase Randolph as Stan Munro
 Jeana Bell as Alice Munro

Gloria Estefan's husband Emilio Estefan Jr. has a small part as the piano player, recording artist LaGaylia Frazier appears as a singer, and character actor Brent Sexton plays Manny.

Reception

Box office
The Specialist opened in the U.S. on October 7 and grossed $14,317,765 in its opening weekend finishing number one at the US box office. In its second weekend, it grossed $8,972,766, finishing second to the claimed $9.3 million gross of Pulp Fiction, however, others disputed Miramax Films' claimed gross and felt that The Specialist was the highest-grossing for the weekend. The film ended up making back its budget with $57,362,582 at the domestic box office while making another $113,000,000 internationally, giving it a worldwide gross of $170,362,582. It set a Warner Bros. record opening in the Philippines with $1.1 million and had the fifth biggest opening of all time in Spain with a gross of $2.1 million. It was Stallone's third highest-grossing movie at the box office in the 1990s and the second highest overall gross next to Cliffhanger.

Audiences polled by CinemaScore gave the film an average grade of "B−" on an A+ to F scale.

Critical response
On Rotten Tomatoes the film has an approval rating of 10% based on reviews from 30 critics.

Roger Ebert gave it two stars out of four, stating that "The Specialist is one of those films that forces the characters through torturous mazes of dialogue and action, to explain a plot that is so unlikely it's not worth the effort. You know a movie's in trouble when the people in line at the parking garage afterward are trying to figure out what the heroine's motivations were." James Berardinelli rated it one and a half out of four stars, writing "This movie is excruciatingly dumb. And, given the releases of Speed and Blown Away this summer, there's no dearth of explosion-based motion pictures. The only twist this one offers is that here, the bomber is the good guy (...)."

The 1996 movie guide "Seen That, Now What?", the film was given the rating of "D+", describing the film as "Strange, would-be erotic thriller/action film is almost torridly bad enough to achieve camp status, with a good supporting cast floundering amidst the explosions and dumb plot."

The film is listed in Golden Raspberry Award founder John Wilson's book The Official Razzie Movie Guide as one of "The 100 Most Enjoyably Bad Movies Ever Made".

Accolades
At the 15th Golden Raspberry Awards, the film was nominated in five categories and won two of them.

 Worst Picture - Nominated
 Worst Actor (Sylvester Stallone) - Nominated
 Worst Actress (Sharon Stone, also for Intersection) – Winner
 Worst Supporting Actor (Rod Steiger) – Nominated
 Worst Screen Couple (Stallone and Stone) – Winner (tied with Tom Cruise and Brad Pitt for Interview with the Vampire)

At the 17th Stinkers Bad Movie Awards, the film was nominated in four categories and won one of them.

 Worst Picture – Nominated
 Worst Actor (Sylvester Stallone) – Nominated
 Worst Actor (Rod Steiger) – Nominated
 Worst Actress (Sharon Stone, also for Intersection) – Winner

Year-end lists
 3rd worst – Sean P. Means, The Salt Lake Tribune
 4th worst – Janet Maslin, The New York Times
 Top 4 worst (not ranked) – Stephen Hunter, The Baltimore Sun
 Top 10 worst (not ranked) – Dan Webster, The Spokesman-Review
 Top 12 worst (Alphabetically ordered, not ranked) – David Elliott, The San Diego Union-Tribune
 Dishonorable mention – William Arnold, Seattle Post-Intelligencer
 Dishonorable mention – Dan Craft, The Pantagraph

References

External links
 
 
 
 

1994 films
1994 action thriller films
1990s spy thriller films
American action thriller films
American chase films
American spy thriller films
Films scored by John Barry (composer)
American films about revenge
Films directed by Luis Llosa
Films set in Colombia
Films set in Miami
Films set in 1984
Golden Raspberry Award winning films
Films shot in Tennessee
Warner Bros. films
1990s chase films
1990s English-language films
1990s American films